Rouge Hill is a GO Transit train and bus station in Toronto, Ontario, Canada. On the Lakeshore East line, the station is located on the shore of Lake Ontario in the West Rouge neighbourhood of the district of Scarborough. It is a major commuter transfer point, with large parking lots and local bus services. Travelling eastwards, it is the last station in Toronto before the trains enter Durham Region.

History

The earliest Port Union Station was situated at Port Union Road, about half a kilometre west of the current location. The Grand Trunk Railway opened the station in 1856 on its Toronto-Montreal mainline, in what was then the small shipbuilding and fishing village of Port Union.

In the days of the steam locomotive, freight trains needed assistance to climb from lake level over the Scarborough Bluffs. Port Union was the easterly end of this helper service with a siding that ran behind the station for waiting locomotives, and a water tower and fuel tanks to resupply westbound trains. With the advent of diesel-electric power those facilities were no longer required and Canadian National Railway subsequently replaced the station with a utilitarian brick building.

A spur line branched off to service the Johns Manville plant which lay on the west side of Port Union Road on the south side of Lawrence Avenue down to the railway line.

Inspection of the CN station found that insufficient space was available there for parking and vehicle access from Port Union Road was poor. A triangle of land could be obtained 500 metres to the east, on the south side of Lawrence Avenue, that would provide enough space for parking and a bus loop with direct access from the street. When construction of the new GO Train facilities commenced, this was the site chosen for the Premier of Ontario John Robarts to ceremonially turn the first sod.

In 2018, Loblaws signed a deal with Metrolinx to have a PC Express pick-up van at this station for online orders.

Connecting bus routes
Toronto Transit Commission
All TTC buses enter the bus loop, with the exception of westbound 54A, 354 and 954 buses.

Durham Region Transit
103 Glenanna connecting the Altona Forest Neighbourhood, Rosebank Rd and Glenanna Rd. Monday to Friday peak hours.

References

External links

Rouge Hill GO Station construction at GO Transit

GO Transit railway stations
Railway stations in Toronto
Transport in Scarborough, Toronto
Railway stations in Canada opened in 1967
1967 establishments in Ontario